The Abbaye de la Déserte or Abbaye Notre-Dame de la Déserte ("Our Lady of the Wasteland") was a nunnery in Lyon, France. Founded in 1303 by Louis de Villars, Archbishop of Lyon, and Blanche de Chalon (Lady of Belleville), who was also the first abbess, it housed the Poor Clares from 1304 till 1503, and then Benedictine nuns from 1503 to the French Revolution, when it was dissolved. It was demolished in 1814.

History
The abbey was founded in the parish of La Platière in an area that was then a wasteland on the southern slopes of the Croix-Rousse. Originally a house of the Poor Clares, it adopted the Rule of St. Benedict in 1503. The abbess was appointed by the King but proofs of nobility were not mandatory for the appointment of the nuns.

In the early 17th century adherence to the Benedictine rule grew lax and Abbess Marguerite de Guibly (the first of the name) applied severe reform in 1620 before instituting the Benedictine rule in the Priory of Our Lady of Bourbon in Auzon with five nuns from La Déserte.

Abbesses
 Blanche de Chalon, founder
 Dame Jeanne Dupuy, 1304
 Mathive de Durchia, 1310
 Aignette de Dreux...
 Jeanne de Durchia...
 Jacquette de Latra...
 Jeanne Humili, 1315
 Jacquette de Lacre, 1331
 Catherine de Vassalieu, 1351
 Tichette de Varey, 1359
 Isabeau d'Huys, 1371
 Isabelle de Joffrey, 1382
 Étiennette de Chalentin, 1406
 Amphélise Burle, 1406
 Bernarde Barrai, 1413
 Beatrice Thimote, 1425
 Catherine Carronnier, 1436
 Antoinette de Turnaire, 1480
 Antoinette de Lupercieu, 1481
 Marguerite de Varey, 1484
 Catherine Garin, 1493
 Catherine de Vaillieu, 1501
 Pernette de la Poype, 1507
 Jeanne de Grammont, 1513
 Catherine de Grammont, 1514
 Antoinette de Saint Amour, 1521
 Claudine de Clérat, 1545
 Louise Dumas, 1566
 Laurence Bernard, 1585
 Guyonne de Chaponay, 1589
 Marguerite de Guibly I, 1618
 Marguerite de Guibly II, 1675
 Antoinette de Châtillon, 1732
 Marie de Foudras, 1715
 Claudine Constance de Moyria de Châtillon, 1732
 Jeanne-Marie-Alexandrine de Montjouvent, 1758

References

1303 establishments in Europe
1300s establishments in France
Benedictine nunneries in France
Buildings and structures demolished in 1814
Demolished buildings and structures in France
Poor Clare monasteries in France